Anne Rygh Pedersen (born 28 June 1967 in Larvik) is a Norwegian politician. She is a member of the Labour Party.

She served in the position of deputy representative to the Norwegian Parliament from Vestfold during the term 2001–2005. Rygh Pedersen was the county mayor of Vestfold 2003–2005. When the second cabinet Stoltenberg assumed office following the 2005 elections, she was appointed State Secretary in the Ministry of Justice and the Police. Rygh Pedersen resigned om February 9, 2007.

She now lives in Tønsberg and has a son.

References

1967 births
Living people
Deputy members of the Storting
Labour Party (Norway) politicians
Norwegian state secretaries
Vestfold politicians
Chairmen of County Councils of Norway
Women members of the Storting
Women mayors of places in Norway
Norwegian women state secretaries
People from Larvik
Politicians from Tønsberg